Noël Bouton, Marquis de Chamilly (6 April 1636 – 8 January 1715) was a French military commander of the 17th and 18th centuries. He was named a Marshal of France in 1703.

References 
 
 

French military personnel of the Franco-Dutch War
French military personnel of the Nine Years' War
French army commanders in the War of the Spanish Succession
18th-century French people
17th-century French people
People of the Ancien Régime
Marshals of France
1636 births
1715 deaths